Mark Levine (or variants) may refer to:

Entertainment
 Mark Levine (musician) (born 1938), American jazz musician
 Mark Levin (born 1957), American conservative radio host
 Mark Levine (poet) (born 1965), American poet
 Mark Levin (director) (born 1966), American director and screenwriter
 Marc Levin, American filmmaker

Politics
 Mark Levine (Virginia politician) (born 1966), delegate in the Virginia State House of Delegates
 Mark Levine (New York politician) (born 1969), Manhattan borough president 
 Marc Levine (born 1974), California legislator

Other
 Marc Levine (mathematician) (born 1952)
 Mark LeVine, American history professor and musician
 Marc A. Levin, American attorney